Kingsbury Hall is a center for the performing arts located on the University of Utah campus in Salt Lake City, Utah.

History
Kingsbury Hall was designed by Edward O. Anderson and Lorenzo Snow Young and built in 1930. It was named after Joseph T. Kingsbury, former president of the University. Many of Utah's performing arts organizations started in Kingsbury Hall, including Ballet West and Utah Opera.  Along with eight buildings along University Circle, Kingsbury Hall is part of the University of Utah Circle historic district, which was listed on the National Register of Historic Places in 1978.

On October 7, 2020, Kingsbury Hall was the site of the vice presidential debate between then Vice President Mike Pence and Democratic nominee and California Senator Kamala Harris.

External links
 Kingsbury Hall Homepage

References

Buildings and structures in Salt Lake City
Concert halls in Utah
Arts centers in Utah
Performing arts centers in Utah
Music venues completed in 1930
Tourist attractions in Salt Lake City
University of Utah
Event venues established in 1930
1930s architecture in the United States
Event venues on the National Register of Historic Places in Utah
National Register of Historic Places in Salt Lake City
University and college buildings on the National Register of Historic Places in Utah